Chamaecytisus is a genus of flowering plants in the legume family, Fabaceae. It belongs to the subfamily Faboideae. It may be a synonym of Cytisus. C. palmensis is a tree from the Canary Islands used as a fodder crop around the world.

Species 

Chamaecytisus comprises the following species:

 Chamaecytisus absinthioides (Janka) Kuzmanov
 var. absinthioides (Janka) Kuzmanov
 var. austriacoides (Stoj.) Kuzmanov
 var. grandiflorus (Stoj.) Kuzmanov
 var. heterophyllus (Bornm.) Micevski
 var. parvifolius (Stoj.) Kuzmanov
 var. pirinicus (Stoj.) Kuzmanov

 Chamaecytisus albidus (DC.) Rothm.
 Chamaecytisus albus (Hacq.) Rothm.—Portuguese broom, white broom
 Chamaecytisus austriacus (L.) Link

 Chamaecytisus blockianus (Pawl.) Klask.
 Chamaecytisus borysthenicus (Gruner) Klask.
 Chamaecytisus calcareus (Velen.) Kuzmanov
 Chamaecytisus capitatus (Scop.) Link
 Chamaecytisus cassius (Boiss.) Rothm.

 Chamaecytisus colchicus (Albov) Port.
 Chamaecytisus creticus (Boiss. & Heldr.) Rothm.

 Chamaecytisus danubialis (Velen.) Rothm.
 Chamaecytisus dorycnioides (Davidov) Frodin & Heyw.
 Chamaecytisus drepanolobus (Boiss.) Rothm.
 Chamaecytisus elongatus (Waldst. & Kit.) Link
 Chamaecytisus eriocarpus (Boiss.) Rothm.
 Chamaecytisus falcatus (Waldst. & Kit.) Holub
 Chamaecytisus frivaldszkyanus (Degen) Kuzm.

 Chamaecytisus graniticus (Rehmann) Rothm.
 Chamaecytisus heuffelii (Wierzb. ex Griseb. & Schenk) Rothm.

 Chamaecytisus hirsutus (L.) Link—big-flower broom, clustered broom
 Chamaecytisus jankae (Velen.) Rothm.
 Chamaecytisus kovacevii (Velen.) Rothm.
 Chamaecytisus kreczetoviczii (Wissjul.) Holub
 Chamaecytisus leiocarpus (A. Kern.) Rothm.

 Chamaecytisus mollis (Cav.) Greuter & Burdet
 Chamaecytisus nejceffii (Urum.) Rothm.
 Chamaecytisus paczoskii (V.I. Krecz.) Klask.

 Chamaecytisus podolicus (Blocki) Klask.

 Chamaecytisus ponomarjovii Czerep.

 Chamaecytisus proliferus (L. f.) Link—tagasaste
 subsp. angustifolius (Kuntze) G. Kunkel
 subsp. meridionalis Acebes
 subsp. proliferus (L. f.) Link
 var. calderae Acebes
 var. canariae (Christ) G. Kunkel
 var. hierrensis (Pit.) Acebes
 var. palmensis (Christ) A. Hansen & Sunding
 var. perezii (Hutch.) G. Kunkel
 var. proliferus (L. f.) Link
 Chamaecytisus pulvinatus (Quezel) Raynaud
 Chamaecytisus purpureus (Scop.) Link—purple broom

 Chamaecytisus ratisbonensis (Schaeff.) Rothm.
 Chamaecytisus rochelii (Wierzb. ex Griseb. & Schenk) Rothm.
 Chamaecytisus ruthenicus (Wol.) Klask.

 Chamaecytisus spinescens (C. Presl) Rothm.

 Chamaecytisus supinus (L.) Link
 Chamaecytisus tommasinii (Vis.) Rothm.
 Chamaecytisus triflorus Skalicka

 Chamaecytisus wulfii (V.I. Krecz.) Klask.

Species names with uncertain taxonomic status
The status of the following species is unresolved:
 Chamaecytisus ambiguus (Schur) Klásk.
 Chamaecytisus anatolicus Güner
 Chamaecytisus biflorus (L'Hér.) Link
 Chamaecytisus gueneri Duman, Baser & Malyer
 Chamaecytisus leucanthus (Waldst. & Kit.) Link
 Chamaecytisus mitrushii F.K.Mey.
 Chamaecytisus pumilus (De Not.) Rothm.
 Chamaecytisus tmolaeus (Boiss.) Rothm.
 Chamaecytisus virescens (Kováts ex Neilr.) Dostál

Hybrids
The following hybrids have been described:
 Chamaecytisus ×cetius (Beck) Dostál
 Chamaecytisus ×millenii (Borbás) Dostál
 Chamaecytisus ×pseudorochelii (Simonk.) Pifkó
 Chamaecytisus ×versicolor (Dippel) Karlsson

References

Genisteae
Fabaceae genera